This page lists notable alumni and former students, faculty, and administrators of Kalamazoo College.

Alumni

Arts and letters
 Selma Blair, actress (graduated from the University of Michigan, but studied at Kalamazoo from 1990 to 1992) 
 Teju Cole, award-winning Nigerian American author
 Mark Crilley, comic book creator and children's book author/illustrator
 David France, journalist and author
 Holly Hughes, performance artist
 Nagai Kafu, author
 Jordan Klepper (2001), comedian, The Daily Show
 Lisa Kron, 2015 Tony Award-winning (Fun Home) playwright and actress
 William Malatinsky, author
 Julie Mehretu, artist, winner of MacArthur "Genius" Award
 Fern Persons (1933), actress
 Diane Seuss (1978), poet and educator, winner of the 2022 Pulitzer Prize for Poetry
 Dorothy B. Waage (1905 - 1997), numismatist
 Maynard Owen Williams, National Geographic correspondent
 Steven Yeun (2005), actor best known for portraying Glenn in The Walking Dead

Government
 Garry E. Brown, politician
 Darrin Q. Camilleri, Member, Michigan House of Representatives
 Amy Courter, former National Commander of the Civil Air Patrol
 Brandt Iden, Member, Michigan House of Representatives
 Alexander Lipsey, Michigan politician
 Gerald Ellis Rosen, United States District Court Judge
 Bradley A. Smith, former Chairman, Federal Election Commission
Chockwe Lumumba, Mayor of Jackson, Mississippi

Business
 Larry Bell, founder of Bell's Brewery
 Harry Garland, entrepreneur
 Mark Spitznagel, hedge fund manager
 Ty Warner, founder, Ty Inc. (Beanie Babies)
 Jon Stryker

Academia
 George C. Baldwin, theoretical and experimental physicist and professor at  General Electric Company, Rensselaer Polytechnic Institute, and Los Alamos National Laboratory
 William F. DeGrado, professor of Pharmaceutical Chemistry at the University of California, San Francisco (UCSF)
 Kenneth G. Elzinga, economics professor at the University of Virginia
 Cassandra Fraser,  chemistry professor at the University of Virginia, and a Fellow of the American Association for the Advancement of Science
 Thomas F. Gieryn, sociology professor at the University of Indiana known for developing the concept of "boundary work" 
David Heath, probabilist, known for developing the Heath–Jarrow–Morton framework to model the evolution of the interest rate curve
 Martin A. Larson, religion scholar
 Katheryn Edmonds Rajnak, theoretical physical chemist
 Tad Schmaltz, philosophy professor at the University of Michigan, early modern philosophy scholar
 Robert J. Shiller, winner of the 2013 Nobel Prize in Economics
 Floyd Wilcox, third president of Shimer College

Other
 John E. Sarno, innovator in back-pain therapy
 David Hildebrand Wilson, founder and curator of Museum of Jurassic Technology

References

Lists of people by university or college in Michigan